Guiyu, in Guangdong Province, China, is widely perceived as the largest electronic waste (e-waste) site in the world.  In 2005, there were 60,000 e-waste workers in Guiyu who processed the more than 100 truckloads that were transported to the 52-square-kilometre area every day. The constant movement into and processing of e-wastes in the area leading to the harmful and toxic environment and living conditions, coupled with inadequate facilities, have led to the Guiyu town being nicknamed the "electronic graveyard of the world".

It is believed that much of the waste is imported from developed countries. The European Union has sanctions against exporting waste to developing countries, but those rules are aggressively ignored. Many waste goods are classed as "charitable donations" before they're dumped on scrap heaps. Similarly, Agbogbloshie, in Ghana, is another example how thousands of tons of electronic waste from Europe is dumped in developing countries.

Health impacts

Once a rice village, the pollution has made Guiyu unable to produce crops for food and the water of the river is undrinkable. Many of the primitive recycling operations in Guiyu are toxic and dangerous to workers' health with 80% of children suffering from lead poisoning. Above-average miscarriage rates are also reported in the region. Workers use their bare hands to crack open electronics to strip away any parts that can be reused—including chips and valuable metals, such as gold, silver, etc. Workers also "cook" circuit boards to remove chips and solders, burn wires and other plastics to liberate metals such as copper; use highly corrosive and dangerous acid baths along the riverbanks to extract gold from the microchips; and sweep printer toner out of cartridges. Children are exposed to the dioxin-laden ash as the smoke billows around Guiyu, and finally settles on the area. The soil surrounding these factories has been saturated with lead, chromium, tin, and other heavy metals. Discarded electronics lie in pools of toxins that leach into the groundwater, making the water undrinkable to the extent that water must be trucked in from elsewhere. Lead levels in the river sediment are double European safety levels, according to the Basel Action Network. Lead in the blood of Guiyu's children is 54% higher on average than that of children in the nearby town of Chendian. Piles of ash and plastic waste sit on the ground beside rice paddies and dikes holding in the Lianjiang River.

A 2008 study titled Heavy Metals Concentrations of Surface Dust from E-Waste Recycling and Its Human Health Implications in Southeast China examined environmental and human health risks in Guiyu by collecting dust samples from workshops, roads, a schoolyard and an outdoor food market that sells fish, vegetables and meat.  The study found that in the workshops, there were elevated levels of lead, copper and zinc; at a schoolyard, there were elevated levels of lead and copper.  Other areas near the school also contained extremely high levels of nickel in areas where children often eat (and are therefore exposed to contaminated dust).  In the food market, high levels of copper, nickel, lead and zinc were found. This was a concern because the food (often placed in plastic buckets on the ground) likely comes into contact with this contaminated dust.  Lead and copper in road dust were 330 and 106, and 371 and 155 times higher, respectively, than non e-waste sites located 8 and 30 km away. High levels of toxic metals at the schoolyard and food market showed that public places were adversely impacted.  Out of all the metals found, lead consistently had the greatest amounts present at all locations, with copper being the second most-abundant.  Levels of lead for a workshop employee exceeded the "safe" amount of oral lead ingestion by 50 times.  Lead levels for the general public were 5 times lower than those for e-waste workers but was still higher than the "safe" amount.  Children, who face great adverse effects from lead poisoning, face a potential health risk at all locations 8 times higher than adults. Studies done in 2009 have revealed that Guiyu has some of the highest levels of dioxin contamination in the world.

Children under the age of 6 are especially vulnerable to lead poisoning, which can severely affect their mental and physical development or even be fatal.  Lead can result in irreversible brain damage to their still developing brains.  Some symptoms of lead poisoning in children include loss of appetite, weight loss, fatigue, stomach pain, vomiting, constipation and learning difficulties.  Symptoms in adults include high blood pressure, decline in mental functioning, pain/numbness of extremities, muscle weakness, headache, stomach pain, memory loss, mood disorders and fertility problems including higher probability of miscarriages.  For both children and adults, lead poisoning can result in damage to the kidneys and nervous system.

Economic rationale
The economic incentives created by strict domestic regulation, non-existent or unenforced regulations in developing countries, and the ease of free trade brought about by globalization, led recyclers to export e-waste. The value of parts in discarded electronics provides an incentive for poverty-stricken citizens to migrate to Guiyu from other provinces to work in processing it. Guiyu has 5,500 businesses, many of them family workshops, that dismantle old electronics to extract lead, gold, copper and other valuable metals.  This industry employs tens of thousands of people and dismantles 1.5 million pounds of discarded computers, cell phones and other electronics each year. The average worker, adult or child, makes barely $1.50/day (or 17 cents/hour). The average workday is sixteen hours. This $1.50 is made by recovering the valuable metals and parts that are within the piles of discarded electronics. Even this relatively tiny profit is enough motivation for workers to risk their health.

Media coverage
Guiyu as an e-waste hub was first documented fully in December 2001 by the Basel Action Network, a non-profit organization which combats the practice of toxic waste export to developing countries in their report and documentary film entitled Exporting Harm. The health and environmental issues exposed by this report and subsequent scientific studies have greatly concerned international organizations such as the Basel Action Network and later Greenpeace and the United Nations Environment Programme and the Basel Convention. Media documentation of Guiyu is tightly regulated by the Chinese government, for fear of exposure or legal action. For example, a November 2008 news story by 60 Minutes, a popular US TV news program, documented the illegal shipments of electronic waste from recyclers in the US to Guiyu. While taping part of the story on-site at an illegal recycling dump in Guiyu, representatives of the Chinese recyclers attempted without success to confiscate the footage from the 60 Minutes TV crew. Greenpeace has protested the environmental impacts of e-waste recycling in Guiyu using different methods to raise awareness such as building a statue using e-waste collected from a site in Guiyu, or delivering a truckload of e-waste dumped in Guiyu back to Hewlett Packard headquarters. Greenpeace has been lobbying large consumer electronics companies to stop using toxic substances in their products, with varying degrees of effectiveness.

In 2005 a Planet Funk video for their song "Stop Me", shows the situation throughout the city, with people living and working inside an e-waste environment.

Cleanup efforts
Since 2007, conditions in Guiyu have changed little despite the efforts of the central government to crack down and enforce the long-standing e-waste import ban. However, because of the work of activist groups and increasing awareness of the situation, the local government has created steps to improve environmental conditions. "It can be done. Look at what happened with lead acid batteries. We discovered they were hazardous, new legislation enforced new ways of dealing with the batteries which led to an infrastructure being created. The key was making it easy for people and companies to participate. It took years to build. E-waste is going the same route. But attitudes have changed and we will get there", says Robert Houghton, president and founder of Redemtech, an asset management and recovery firm. Zheng Songming, head of the Guiyu Township government has published a decree to ban burning electronics in fires and soaking them in sulfuric acid, and promises supervision and fines for violations. Over 800 coal-burning furnaces have been destroyed because of this ordinance, and most notably, air quality has returned to Level II, now technically acceptable for habitation.

In 2013, 《汕头市贵屿地区电子废物污染综合整治方案》(Comprehensive Scheme of Resolving Electronic Waste Pollution of Guiyu region of Shantou City) was approved by Guangdong Province government. Part of this scheme involves building and relocating all the workshops into an industrial ecology park where the wastes can be properly treated and recycled. In 2017, most workshops were merged into larger companies and moved to the National Circular Economy Pilot Industry Park. However, many areas are still contaminated from the remnants of e-waste processing and have not been cleaned up.

In popular culture
 Chen Qiufan's  novel The Waste Tide is heavily inspired by the recycling industry and environmental issues of Guiyu.

See also
Electronic waste in China
Environmental issues in China
Pollution in China

References

External links
 Viceland: CTRL+ALT+LANDFILL – China's Secret Computer Graveyard
The complete photo service from Vice's photographer Luca Gabino
 Video about e-waste in Guiyu
Series of pictures of e-waste in Guiyu -- Greenpeace China
FOXNews.com - Chinese Recyclers Live in Toxic E-Waste Dump - Science News | Science & Technology | Technology News

Shantou
Guiyu
Electronic waste in China
Landfills